Revivim is a kibbutz in the Negev desert in southern Israel. Located around half an hour south of Beersheba, it falls under the jurisdiction of Ramat HaNegev Regional Council.

History

1943 establishment
The community was formed in 1943 in Rishon LeZion by help of UK government and young Jewish refugees (olim) from Austria, Italy and Germany, all of whom were members of HaNoar HaOved VeHaLomed who had been educated at kibbutz Givat Brenner.

The kibbutz itself was established on 7 July 1943 as one of the three lookouts, and was initially named Tel HaTzofim (lit. Scout's hill). It was later renamed Revivim by Berl Katznelson after the magazine edited by Yosef Haim Brenner (for whom Givat Brenner was named), and its name is also taken from the Bible, : "You (Lord) ... level its ridges, you soften it with showers."

1948 war
During the 1948 Arab–Israeli War, Revivim fell behind Egyptian lines for several months. Members of the kibbutz lived in underground dugouts, and received food supplies by air and convoys that ran the Egyptian battle lines. Thirty members of the kibbutz survived the war, while eight were killed in raids and pitched battles with Egyptian forces.

Mizpe Revivim 1948 museum
Near the kibbutz stands Mizpe Revivim (lit. Revivim lookout), a museum depicting the history of the "lookout" observer points and the events of the 1948 war in the northern Negev.

Economy
Revivim's economy is based on agriculture, including olive groves (irrigated with brackish water), a large dairy farm and a chicken hatchery.
Aside from agriculture, Revivim has interests in a variety of industries including an injection moulding company ("Raviv") and a company that designs and produces valves for automotive fuel systems ("Raval").

Notable people

 Golda Meir, late Prime Minister of Israel

References

External links
Official website 
Revivim Negev Information Centre

Kibbutzim
Kibbutz Movement
Populated places established in 1943
Populated places in Southern District (Israel)
1943 establishments in Mandatory Palestine
Austrian-Jewish culture in Israel
German-Jewish culture in Israel
Italian-Jewish culture in Israel